Biorheology is a scientific journal in the field of biorheology, the study of flow properties (rheology) of biological fluids, published by IOS Press. It is published quarterly since 2018. It was established in 1962 by founding editors A.L. Copley and G.W. Scott Blair. It is currently edited by Herbert H. Lipowsky (Penn State University) and Brian M. Cooke (Australian Institute of Tropical Health and Medicine).

Rheology
Physics journals
Biology journals
IOS Press academic journals
Quarterly journals
Publications established in 1962